Fikri Işık MP (born 13 September 1965) is a Turkish politician who served as the last Deputy Prime Minister of Turkey from 2017 to 2018. Previously, he served as Minister of Science, Industry and Technology from 2013 to 2016 and Minister of National Defense from 2016 to 2017. He is a Member of Parliament representing the Kocaeli Province on behalf of the ruling Justice and Development Party (AKP), since 2007. Before politics, Işık was an educator.

Early life
Fikri Işık was born on 13 September 1965 to Tevfik and Mecbure Işık in the village of Babacan in Şiran district of Gümüşhane Province, Turkey. He studied Mathematics Education at the Middle East Technical University in Ankara.

Career

Profession
Işık worked as a mathematics and English language teacher in private schools at İzmit and Istanbul. He served also as manager in the food industry.

Politics
Fikri Işık entered politics on 20 October 2001 through his founding membership of the Justice and Development Party's Kocaeli Province organization. He was elected its chairman on 22 June 2003, serving four years at this post.

In 2007, he left his chair at the regional level to run for a seat in the parliament. Işık was elected into the Grand National Assembly of Turkey in the 2007 general election as an MP from Kocaeli Province. He was re-elected a second time into the parliament in the 2011 general election. Between 2007 and 2013, he was responsible in the party headquarters for the coordination of the part's regional organizations in 47 provinces across the country. On 31 January 2013, Işık became chairman of the parliamentary National Education, Youth and Sports Commission.

On 26 December 2013, Fikri Işık assumed office as the Minister of Science, Industry and Technology, succeeding Nihat Ergün during Erdoğan's cabinet reshuffle with ten new names that was announced the day before, on 25 December, following the 2013 corruption scandal in Turkey.

Personal life
Fikri Işık is married and has four children.

References

1965 births
People from Şiran
Middle East Technical University alumni
Turkish schoolteachers
Justice and Development Party (Turkey) politicians
Deputies of Kocaeli
Government ministers of Turkey
Living people
Members of the 26th Parliament of Turkey
Members of the 25th Parliament of Turkey
Members of the 24th Parliament of Turkey
Members of the 23rd Parliament of Turkey
Members of the 63rd government of Turkey
Members of the 64th government of Turkey
Members of the 65th government of Turkey
Ministers of National Defence of Turkey
Ministers of Science Industry and Technology of Turkey